DPP may stand for:

Business 
Digital Production Partnership, of UK public service broadcasters
Digital Product Passport, e.g. EU Digital Product Passport
 Direct Participation Program, a financial security
 Discounted payback period

Photography 
 Digital Photo Professional, Canon software

Law enforcement 
 Director of Public Prosecutions, responsible for criminal prosecutions

Politics 
 Danish People's Party, a Danish political party
 Democratic Progressive Party, a political party of Taiwan
 Democratic Progressive Party (Malawi)
 Democratic Progressive Party (Singapore)
 Democratic Progressive Party of Hong Kong
 Democratic Party for the People, a Japanese political party

Medicine and science 
 Decapentaplegic, a morphogen involved in development
 Diketopyrrolopyrrole dye, a class of organic dyes and pigments
 Dipeptidyl peptidases 3-10: DPP3, DPP4, DPP6, DPP7, DPP8, DPP9, DPP10
 Differential Pulse Polarography, a type of electrochemical scan

Other 
 Dark Passion Play
 Department of Plant Protection (Pakistan)

See also
 DP (disambiguation)
 DP2 (disambiguation)
 DDP (disambiguation)